Thomas Young was a Scottish amateur football outside left who played in the Scottish League for Queen's Park and Queen of the South. He was capped by Scotland at amateur level.

References 

Scottish footballers
Queen's Park F.C. players
Scottish Football League players
Scotland amateur international footballers
Association football fullbacks
Year of birth missing
Place of birth missing
Year of death missing
Queen of the South F.C. players